The Thrissur Municipal Corporation manages the distribution of electricity to residents and commercial establishments through Thrissur Corporation Electricity Department. The distribution network covers about 12.63 square kilometers and has 36,000 connections. 

Thrissur Municipal Corporation and TCED are separate entities and the TCED is run on a commercial basis. The municipal corporation purchases power in bulk from the Kerala State Electricity Board (KSEB). The budget for this operation, however, is separately prepared and is not included in the annual municipal corporation budget. The separate books of accounts of the operation are also kept under the cash-based system.

References

Local government in Kerala
Government of Thrissur
Organisations based in Thrissur
Science and technology in Thrissur
Energy in Kerala
Year of establishment missing